Namibotites argentata is a species of ulidiid or picture-winged fly in the genus Namibotites of the family Tephritidae.

Distribution
Namibia.

References

Ulidiidae
Insects described in 2000
Diptera of Africa
Endemic fauna of Namibia